The 2014–15 season was the 12th in the history of the Scarlets Welsh regional rugby union side, in which they competed in the Pro12, the European Rugby Champions Cup and the Anglo-Welsh Cup. It was head coach Wayne Pivac's first season in charge of the region, after Simon Easterby left the Scarlets to become Ireland's forwards coach. In addition to Pivac, Byron Hayward joined the region as a defence coach, while Danny Wilson left for Bristol. In September 2014, Mark Davies stepped down as chief executive to take up a role with Pro Rugby Wales, and was replaced by Darran Phillips.

Pre-season and friendlies

Pro 12

Fixtures

Table

Anglo-Welsh Cup

Fixtures

Table

European Champions Cup

Fixtures

Table
Pool Three

Transfers

In

Out 

Note:

Statistics
(+ in the Apps column denotes substitute appearance)

Stats accurate as of match played 16 May 2015

References 

2014–15
2014–15 Pro12 by team
2014–15 in Welsh rugby union
2014–15 European Rugby Champions Cup by team